Senator Hall may refer to:

Alfred A. Hall (1848–1912), Vermont State Senate
Benton Jay Hall (1835–1894), Iowa State Senate
Bob Hall (politician) (born 1942), Texas State Senate
Chris Hall (university president) (born 1956), Maine State Senate
Chuck Hall (Oklahoma politician), Oklahoma State Senate
Dan Hall (politician) (born 1952), Minnesota State Senate
Daniel Hall (West Virginia politician) (born 1974), West Virginia State Senate
Darwin Hall (1844–1919), Minnesota State Senate
Elmer Hall (1866–1952), Wisconsin State Senate
Harber H. Hall (born 1920), Illinois State Senate
Isadore Hall III (born 1971), California State Senate
James Knox Polk Hall (1844–1915), Pennsylvania State Senate
James Randal Hall (born 1958), Georgia State Senate
John C. Hall (1821–1896), Wisconsin State Senate
John W. Hall (1817–1892), Delaware State Senate
Joshua G. Hall (1828–1898), New Hampshire State Senate
Katie Hall (American politician) (1938–2012), Indiana State Senate
Kenneth Hall (Illinois politician) (1915–1995), Illinois State Senate
Luther E. Hall (1869–1921), Louisiana State Senate
Mike Hall (West Virginia politician) (born 1948), West Virginia State Senate
Oliver Hall (1852–1946), Washington State Senate
Osee M. Hall (1847–1914), Minnesota State Senate
Philo Hall (1865–1938), South Dakota State Senate
Ralph Hall (1923–2019), Texas State Senate
Robert A. Hall (born 1946), Massachusetts State Senate
Robert Bernard Hall (1812–1868), Massachusetts State Senate
Robert S. Hall (1879–1941), Mississippi State Senate
Rodney Hall (politician) (born 1928), South Dakota State Senate
Samuel H. P. Hall (1804–1877), New York State Senate
Stephen Hall (politician) (1941–2014), Maine State Senate
Thomas H. Hall (1773–1853), North Carolina State Senate
Tony P. Hall (born 1942), Ohio State Senate
Willard Hall (1780–1875), Delaware State Senate
William Pike Hall Sr. (1896–1945), Louisiana State Senate
William Hall (governor) (1775–1856), Tennessee State Senate
Wilton E. Hall (1901–1980), U.S. Senator from South Carolina